() is a Hebrew word that means 'kindness or love between people', specifically of the devotional piety of people towards God as well as of love or mercy of God towards humanity. It is frequently used in Psalms in the latter sense, where it is traditionally translated "loving kindness" in English translations.

In Jewish theology it is likewise used of God's love for the Children of Israel, and in Jewish ethics it is used for love or charity between people.  in this latter sense of 'charity' is considered a virtue on its own, and also for its contribution to tikkun olam (repairing the world). It is also considered the foundation of many religious commandments practiced by traditional Jews, especially interpersonal commandments.

 is also one of the ten Sephirot on the Kabbalistic Tree of Life.

Etymology and translations
The root  has a primary meaning of 'eager and ardent desire', used both in the sense 'good, kind' and 'shame, contempt'. The noun  inherits both senses, on one hand 'zeal, love, kindness towards someone' and on the other 'zeal, ardour against someone; envy, reproach'. In its positive is used of mutual benevolence, mercy or pity between people, of devotional piety of people towards God, as well as the grace, favour or mercy of God towards people.

It occurs 248 times in the Hebrew Bible. In the majority of cases (149 times), the King James Bible (KJV) translation is mercy, following the Septuagint (LXX) . Less frequent translations are: kindness (40 times), lovingkindness (30 times), goodness (12 times), kindly (five times), merciful (four times), favour (three times) and good, goodliness, pity (once each).
Only two instances of the noun in its negative sense are in the text, translated reproach in Proverbs 14:34, and wicked thing in Leviticus 20:17.

The translation of loving kindness in KJV is derived from the Coverdale Bible of 1535. This particular translation is used exclusively of  used of the benign attitude of YHWH ("the ") or Elohim ("God") towards his chosen, primarily invoked in Psalms (23 times), but also in the prophets, four times in Jeremiah, twice in Isaiah 63:7 and once in Hosea 2:19. While lovingkindness is now considered somewhat archaic, it is part of the traditional rendition of Psalms in English Bible translations. Some more recent translations use steadfast love where KJV has lovingkindness.

The Septuagint has  'great mercy', rendered as Latin misericordia.
'be favourable to me, Elohim, as your '):

In Judaism, love is often used as a shorter English translation. Political theorist Daniel Elazar has suggested that  cannot easily be translated into English, but that it means something like 'loving covenant obligation'. Other suggestions include grace and compassion.

Jewish ethics

In traditional musar literature (ethical literature),  is one of the primary virtues.  The tannaic rabbi Simon the Just taught: "The world rests upon three things: Torah, service to God, and bestowing kindness" (Pirkei Avot 1:2).  is here the core ethical virtue.

In Moses ben Jacob Cordovero's kabbalistic treatise Tomer Devorah, the following are actions undertaken in imitation of the qualities of :
 love God so completely that one will never forsake his service for any reason
 provide a child with all the necessities of their sustenance and love the child
 circumcise a child
 visiting and healing the sick
 giving charity to the poor
 offering hospitality to strangers
 attending to the dead
 bringing a bride to the chuppah marriage ceremony
 making peace between a person and another human being.

These groups include the Hasideans of the Second Temple period, the Maimonidean Hasidim of medieval Egypt and Palestine, the Chassidei Ashkenaz in medieval Europe, and the Hasidic movement which emerged in eighteenth century Eastern Europe.

Charitable organizations
In Modern Hebrew,  can take the generic meaning of 'charity', and a " institution" in modern Judaism 
may refer to any charitable organization run by religious Jewish groups or individuals.
Charitable organizations described as " institutions" include:
 Bikur cholim organizations, dedicated to visiting and caring for the sick and their relatives
Such organizations are often named with an acronym of  such as Gemach or GM"CH. A community may have dozens of unique (and sometimes overlapping) Gemach organizations
 Kiruv organizations – organizations designed to increase Jewish awareness among unaffiliated Jews, which is considered a form of kindness
 Hatzolah – organizations by this name typically provide free services for emergency medical dispatch and ambulance transport (EMTs and paramedics)
 Chevra kadisha – organizations that perform religious care for the deceased, and often provide logistical help to their families relating to autopsies, transport of the body, emergency family travel, burial, running a Shiva home, and caring for mourners
 Chaverim (literally 'friends') – organizations going by this name typically provide free roadside assistance and emergency help with mechanical or structural problems in private homes
 Shomrim (guardians) groups – community watch groups
In the former USSR member republics there are Jewish charities, each one often called a  plus a Jewish given name, usually of a Jewish history character like Hesed Avraam in Saint Petersburg, Russia, a member of Association of Heseds of Russia. They run multiple programs: daycare centres and health visitors/carers for the elderly and disabled (the latter equally available to people of non-Jewish ancestry with local government subsidies), crafts and arts societies, concerts, medical equipment rental for registered patients free or on small fees calculated from the size of the patient's pension, delivery of meals and grocery items to home stay patients, shopping subsidies for the poor, volunteer medical consulting, volunteer small repair of household items, assistance with documents processing to apply for compensation from Germany for Holocaust survivors.

Kabbalah

The first three of the ten  are the attributes of the intellect, while  is the first  of the attribute of action. In the kabbalistic Tree of life, its position is below Chokhmah, across from Gevurah and above Netzach.

The Bahir states, "What is the fourth (utterance): The fourth is the righteousness of God, His mercies and kindness with the entire world. This is the right hand of God."  manifests God's absolute, unlimited benevolence and kindness.

The angelic order of this sphere is the Hashmallim, ruled by the Archangel Zadkiel. The opposing Qliphah is represented by the demonic order Gamchicoth (or Gha'agsheblah), ruled by the Archdemon Astaroth.

See also
 Agape (Greek, Christianity)
 Divine love
 Hasid
 Ishq (Arabic, Islam)
 Jewish views on love
 Mettā (Pali, Buddhism)

References

External links

Jewish ethics
Kabbalistic words and phrases
Sephirot
Love
Kindness